Dube on 2 was a South African television comedy talk show and sketch comedy show hosted by Desmond Dube, and broadcast by SABC 2 from 2004 to 2007. Regular cast members include Lee Duru, John Lata, and (in the second season) Angela de Villiers, among others. South African celebrities—such as Ishmael, Simphiwe Dana, and Lebo Mathosa—made guest appearances on the show.

References

English-language television shows
South African comedy television series
Television sketch shows
Television talk shows
SABC 2 original programming